The Oklahoma State Penitentiary, nicknamed "Big Mac", is a prison of the Oklahoma Department of Corrections located in McAlester, Oklahoma, on . Opened in 1908 with 50 inmates in makeshift facilities, today the prison holds more than 750 male offenders, the vast majority of which are maximum-security inmates.

Construction and early years

Before Oklahoma became a state in 1907, felons convicted in Oklahoma Territory and Indian Territory were sent to the Kansas State Penitentiary in Lansing, Kansas. At statehood, Kate Barnard became Oklahoma Commissioner of Charities and Corrections. During the summer of 1908, Barnard arrived unannounced at the Kansas prison to investigate widespread complaints she had received about mistreatment of Oklahoma inmates. She took a regular tour with other visitors first, then identified herself to prison officials and asked that she be allowed to conduct an inspection of the facility. Barnard discovered systematic, widespread torture of inmates.

Upon her return to Oklahoma, Barnard recommended that all Oklahoma inmates be removed from the Lansing facility and returned to the state. Governor of Oklahoma Charles N. Haskell supported Barnard's proposal, and within two months of Barnard's visit to Kansas, on October 14, 1908, two groups of 50 offenders each were sent by train to McAlester. The inmates were temporarily housed in the former federal jail in the town. Under direction from Warden Robert W. Dick, they built a stockade to house themselves on a  plot northwest of McAlester, which was donated to the state by a group of McAlester citizens.

The remaining Oklahoma inmates in Lansing were moved to the United States Penitentiary, Leavenworth until the state could build adequate facilities to house them all. The next spring, in 1909, the Oklahoma Legislature appropriated $850,000 to build the permanent facility.

Construction began in May 1909 on a prison designed after the Leavenworth facility. The state purchased about  surrounding the original plot of land. Using prison labor, the West Cellhouse and Administration Building were completed first; the Rotunda and East Cellhouse came later. The F Cellhouse was added in 1935, and later the New Cellhouse was constructed. A shoe manufacturing plant and a tailor shop were part of the prison's inmate industry program, designed to provide work for offenders; at Lansing, prisoners were forced to work in the local mines, a practice Barnard banned. The Warden's House, across the street from the prison, is listed on the National Register of Historic Places.

Female prisoners were sent to Kansas in territorial days also. The first females brought back from Kansas stayed in a ward near the East Gate, built in 1911, on the fourth floor of the West Cellhouse.

The first prison escape (from behind the walls) occurred on January 19, 1914. Three inmates stole a gun and killed three prison employees and retired federal judge John Robert Thomas during the escape attempt. The convicts were later killed behind a rock ledge located on a ridge overlooking a wagon road.

Riots and lawsuits 
By the early 1970s, advocacy groups warned the state government that the situation was becoming dire. From 1970 until July 27, 1973, the facility cataloged 19 violent deaths, 40 stabbings and 44 serious beatings.  On January 22, 1973, prisoners staged a hunger strike that lasted 3 days in an attempt to draw attention to the conditions at the facility.

On July 27, 1973, trouble began in the prison's mess hall, reportedly started by five inmates who, according to a prison spokesman, "were doped up on something." It quickly spread through the rest of the facility. At the end of the riot three days later, three inmates were dead, 12 buildings were burned, and 21 inmates and guards had been injured. Damage was estimated at $30 million.

A federal court in 1978 found conditions at OSP unconstitutional. The lawsuit, filed by one inmate before the riot, was changed to a class action suit after the riot. U.S. District Judge Luther Bohannon put the Department of Correction under federal control. The last issue of the lawsuit, medical care for offenders, was settled 27 years later, in 2001.

Consequent to the court's orders, four new housing units were built at OSP, and in 1984 the aging East and West Cellhouses were closed. In 1983, all female inmates were moved to Mabel Bassett Correctional Center in Oklahoma City.

On December 17, 1985, the inmates became disruptive, then gained control and took five employees as hostages on A and C units. Three of the hostages were seriously injured before their release the next day. The disturbance caused more than $375,000 in damage and two of the hostages were permanently disabled. After this incident, security was overhauled at the prison to reduce inmate movements, limit recreation, and institute a level-ranking system for offenders to improve safety.

The Talawanda Heights Minimum Security Unit was opened outside the East Gate Area in October 1989 to house inmates who hold support jobs inside the facility. In 1992, a special care unit opened to provide mental health care to offenders, reducing the need for psychiatric hospitalization outside the prison. A medium security unit with a capacity of 140 inmates is located on G and I units to help prisoners adjust to a lower security classification.

Another addition to the prison, H Unit, houses inmates under both administrative and disciplinary segregation. H Unit is also the site of Oklahoma's death row and the state's lethal injection death chamber.

Death Row and executions
Between 1915 and 2014, Oklahoma executed a total of 192 men and 3 women. 3 different methods of execution have been employed by the state. Lethal injection, which was first used on September 10, 1990, has been used 116 times. Other execution methods have included the hanging of a federal prisoner, and 82 electrocutions using the electric chair commonly referred to as "Old Sparky", a method that was last performed in 1966.

In March 2015, Gov. Mary Fallin signed into law HB1879 providing for nitrogen hypoxia as an alternative to the primary execution method of lethal injection. In March 2018, Attorney General Michael J. Hunter and Corrections Director Joe M. Allbaugh announced that Oklahoma would start using inert gas asphyxiation as the primary method of execution. Oklahoma Department of Corrections has had difficulty obtaining the drugs used to perform lethal injections.

Prison rodeo
Starting in 1940, except for a handful of years during World War II and during the 1970s inmate uprising, OSP held a prison rodeo until 2009. A two-day event was held in August, or on Labor Day weekend (accounts differ), the rodeo was a joint venture between the city of McAlester and the state Department of Corrections. The  McAlester Chamber of Commerce contracted with the city to coordinate and market the event, which was last held in 2009 due to a state budget shortfall starting in 2010. Inmates from several prisons throughout the state competed. Attendance at the 12,500-seat arena was down in the 2000s from the 65,000 who routinely attended during a four-day version of the event in the 1960s. The animal-rights group PETA denounced the rodeo on grounds of animal cruelty.

Female convicts began competing in 2006, leading to the documentary film, Sweethearts of the Prison Rodeo (2009), about the co-ed competition.

As of 2021, the rodeo had still not returned, despite support from the warden and Governor Kevin Stitt. The biggest barrier remained the cost of restoring the arena.

Use in popular culture
The prison was mentioned in:
 The Grapes of Wrath and in the Woody Guthrie song The Ballad Of Tom Joad, which was based on the book
 The Innocent Man: Murder and Injustice in a Small Town, a nonfiction book by John Grisham
 Dirty White Boys, a fiction book by Stephen Hunter
 The Outsider, a novel by Stephen King 
 The Longest Yard includes a scene where a player says he played football at Oklahoma State. When prompted further he says "Oklahoma State Penitentiary"
The facility is shown in scenes of the movie Heaven's Rain by Paul Brown and Brooks Douglass.

Notable prisoners

Current
 Kevin Ray Underwood (Murder of 10 year old Jamie Rose Bolin. Sentenced to death)
 Julius Jones (Originally sentenced to death, commuted to life in prison without the possibility of parole)

Former
 C. L. Harkins – Wealthy veterinary surgeon, convicted of rape. Acquitted of three counts of murder.
 Charles Coleman (Executed on September 10, 1990) – Convicted murderer who was the first person to be executed in Oklahoma since 1966.
 Thomas J. Grasso (Executed on March 20, 1995) – Convicted murderer who was executed for strangling an 87-year-old woman.
 Roger Dale Stafford (Executed on July 1, 1995) – Convicted serial killer sentenced to death on Oct. 17, 1979, and spent over 15 years on death row for the 1978 Lorenz-Sirloin Stockade murders.
 Clayton Lockett (Executed on April 29, 2014) – Convicted of a 1999 murder, rape and kidnapping. Lockett's execution made headlines for the series of events that took place during his execution, resulting in the Governor ordering a review of the execution process.
 John Marion Grant (Executed on October 28, 2021) – Convicted of a 1998 murder. His execution was the first in over six years and generated controversy.
 Nannie Doss – Prolific serial killer who died of Leukemia while incarcerated in the Penitentiary.
 Karl Myers - murderer and suspected serial killer who was given two death sentences for the sexually-motivated murders of two women killed in 1993 and 1996. Died on December 28, 2012, from natural causes.

See also

 List of people executed in Oklahoma (since 1976)
 William S. Key, Major General and Warden of Oklahoma State Penitentiary 1924-1927

References

External links
 Oklahoma State Penitentiary—Oklahoma Department of Corrections]
 Offenders - Death Row

1908 establishments in Oklahoma
1985 riots
Buildings and structures in Pittsburg County, Oklahoma
Capital punishment in Oklahoma
Execution sites in the United States
Prison uprisings in the United States
Prisons in Oklahoma